Samanea is an Asian company with its headquarter in Singapore and its China headquarter in Foshan, Guangdong. The company develops and operates large scale business centres in the greater Asia region and provides ancillary facilities such as conference and exhibition centres, business hotels, office buildings and commercial flats as the core of the business centres.

Samanea has operations in 8 countries and 8 cities in the Greater Asia region: Yangon (Myanmar), Phnom Penh (Cambodia), Jakarta (Indonesia), Bangkok (Thailand), Sydney (Australia), Dubai (UAE), Manila (Philippines), Dhaka (Bangladesh) and exploring other Asian countries actively  such as Vietnam, Nepal, Sri Lanka and Malaysia.

Naming 
The name Samanea is derived from the Latin name for rain tree. It is recognisable by its massive umbrella-shaped, widely spreading crown that can reach 20 to 30 metres across. Samanea (company), used in their branding, implies that just like the rain tree, they provide well-rounded support for small-businesses growing nationwide and venturing overseas with their trading services platform.

History 

 February 2019: Samanea Singapore head office opened  officially
 November 2019: Samanea makes its debut on national information platforms
 August 2020: Samanea's Myanmar Business City, Cambodia Business City, Indonesia Business City and Thailand Business City in South East Asia are open for business
 August 2020: Samanea takes a strategic stake in Guangdong Huicong Home Appliance City Investment Co., Ltd.
 December 2020: Construction of the second phase of Samanea Phnom Penh Business City commences
 December 2020: Samanea awarded "Best Business Platform of the Belt and Road"
 August 2021: Construction of Samanea Phnom Penh Trade City (Phase II) officially begins
 April 2022: Successful topping out of the main construction of the second phase of Samanea Indonesia in Jakarta
 May 2022: The leaders of the Cambodian Chinese General Council visited Samanea combodia.

Projects

Myanmar 
Samanea Yangon market covers an area of 300,000 square metres in Yangon, Myanmar. Its core product is the Samanea Yangon market a modern large-scale professional market with a mix of wholesale and retail.

Project address: Corner of Bago River Road and Yadanar,Dagon Seikkan Township,Yangon,Myanmar

In August 2018, Samanea Yangon Market officially opened.

In October 2018, the project began to be lifted.

June 2020, the main market of Samanea Yangon Market Phase I had been completed.

August 2020,Samanea Yangon Market Phase I market starts trial operation.

Cambodia 
Samanea Phnom Penh Market covers an area of 500,000 square metres in Phnom Penh, Cambodia. Its core product is Samanea Cambodia Market, a modern large-scale professional market with a mix of wholesale and retail.

Project address: 23 km of NP4,Phnom Penh, Cambodia

Grand opening of Samanea Phnom Penh Trade City Phase I in 2020

Samanea Cambodia Market Phase 2 will commence construction on 2 December 2020.

Indonesia 
Samanea Jakarta market covers an area of nearly 200,000 square metres in Cikupa, Tangerang Regency, Banten, Jakarta, Indonesia. Its core product is the Samanea Indonesia market, an integrated online and offline wholesale sourcing platform.

Project address: Tangerang New City, Jakarta, Indonesia

In 2020, the first phase of the market  be opened.

In 2022, the main body of the phase II of Samanea Jakarta market will be completed, with a floor area of over 300,000 square metres and over 4,000 shops, and is expected to be operated the market in 2023.

Thailand 
Samanea Bangkok market occupies a total area of 330,000 square metres in Bangkok, Thailand. The core product of Samanea Thailand market is the Samanea Thailand market, a modern large-scale professional market with a mix of wholesale and retail.

Project address: Bang Na-Trad KM-26,Bangkok, Thailand

Construction of Samanea Thailand market will commence in March 2019

Samanea Thailand market opens for business on 29 August 2020

UAE 
Samanea UAE Dubai Logistics Centre is located in the Dubai Industrial Park and covers a total area of 53,000 square metres.

Project address: Dubai Industrial City,Dubai,UAE

Philippines 
Samanea Philippines market is located in the province of Pampanga, in the central hinterland of Northern Luzon, Philippines, and covers a total area of approximately 170,000 square metres.

Project Address: Pampanga Province, Northern Luzon, Philippines

Australia 
Samanea Australia market is a 35,000 square metre site located at 93 St Hilliers Road, Auburn, Sydney, New South Wales, Australia.

Address: 79-99 St Hillers Road, Auburn ,NSW 2144,Australia

References 

Companies established in 2018
Companies of Singapore